Keralotsavam 2009 is a 2009  Indian Malayalam-language action drama comedy film directed by Shankar and written by Satheesh K. Sivan and Suresh Menon. The film stars Vinu Mohan, Vishnupriya, Nedumudi Venu, and Kalabhavan Mani. Keralotsavam 2009 deals with terrorism taking control of a youngster's dream to make it big in his life.

Plot

Padmanabhan Embranthiri is running an institution viz. 'Kalanikethan'. He is invited to perform the Kerala art forms on the stage of a cultural festival named Keralotsavam 2009. His daughter Ganga was doing research in Mohiniyattam. So she was entrusted in doing all the arrangements of the programme.

Sandeep Subramanyam arrives there to perform Kalaripayattu. There he meets Ganga and falls in love. But he is a terrorist named Javed Ibrahim in disguise and his mission is to blast a bomb during the Keralotsavam event. The terrorist group aims to destroy the communal harmony and evoke a riot. Whether or not Sandeep aka Javed succeeds in the mission forms the climax of the movie.

Cast

Release 
The film was originally scheduled to release on 4 December 2009 before being delayed to 11th.

Box office 
The film had an average box office run.

References

 
 https://web.archive.org/web/20090613035311/http://popcorn.oneindia.in/title/2880/keralotsavam-2009.html
 http://www.metromatinee.com/movies/index.php?FilmID=3068-Keralotsavam%202009
 http://movies.rediff.com/slide-show/2009/dec/15/slide-show-1-south-malayalam-films-christmas.htm

External links
 

2009 films
2000s Malayalam-language films